The 2019–20 Scottish League One (known as Ladbrokes League One for sponsorship reasons) was the 25th season in the current format of 10 teams in the third-tier of Scottish football. The fixtures were published in June 2019 and the season began on 3 August 2019.

Ten teams contested the league: Airdrieonians, Clyde, Dumbarton, East Fife, Falkirk, Forfar Athletic, Montrose, Peterhead, Raith Rovers and Stranraer.

On 13 March 2020 all SPFL leagues were indefinitely suspended due to the COVID-19 pandemic. On 8 April, with the pandemic continuing, the SPFL board proposed to curtail the 2019–20 League One season and use the points per game earned by each team to date as the final standings. The plan was approved on 15 April, meaning the league was declared over and Raith Rovers were crowned champions and Stranraer relegated to League 2.

Teams
The following teams have changed division since the 2018–19 season.

To League One
Promoted from League Two
 Peterhead
 Clyde

Relegated from the Championship
 Falkirk

From League One
Relegated to League Two
 Stenhousemuir
 Brechin City

Promoted to the Championship
 Arbroath

Stadia and locations

Personnel and kits

Managerial changes

League summary

League table

Results
Teams play each other four times, twice in the first half of the season (home and away) and twice in the second half of the season (home and away), making a total of 180 games, with each team playing 36.

First half of season

Second half of season

Season statistics

Scoring

Top scorers

Hat-tricks

Note

5 Player scored five goals

Attendances

Awards

Monthly awards

References

Scottish League One seasons
3
3
Scot
Scotland